An oxaprostaglandin is a type of prostaglandin with one carbon atom replaced by an oxygen atom. These are found in nature and have also been produced synthetically.

Medical uses 

A 13-oxaprostaglandin analogue has been shown to treat glaucoma and ocular hypertension. The 11-oxa prostaglandin analogue AL-12182 1 has potent topical ocular hypotensive activity. 7-Oxa-13-prostynoic acid promotes erythrocyte lysis and dissolution of erythrocyte membranes.

Synthesis 

11-Oxaprostaglandin f2α and 11-oxaprostaglandin f2β have been synthesized from D-glucose.

References 

Prostaglandins